Satisfaction (also titled Girls of Summer) is a 1988 American comedy-drama film directed by Joan Freeman and starring Justine Bateman and Liam Neeson. Primarily known today as Julia Roberts' first credited big-screen role, Satisfaction is also one of the few theatrical productions by either Aaron Spelling or the NBC network.

Plot
Jennie Lee is the lead singer of the all-girl Baltimore rock band, the Mystery. At her high school graduation, Jennie gives her valedictorian speech while fellow band member, bass guitarist Daryle accepts a proposal from her high school sweetheart Frankie. 

Jennie and the band are going to Florida to audition for a gig at a nightclub for the summer. However, many problems arise, first Jennie's older brother doesn't want her to go because it could alter her college plans; second, the band's keyboardist has unexpectedly left the band, and third, their drummer Mooch insulted a gang member who then destroyed their van. She tells the band that she borrowed a van from her friend but in fact, with guitarist Billie's help, she stole the gang member's personal van.

After recruiting a male keyboard player Nicky, the band heads south for the audition. Arriving at the nightclub after closing, they fear they missed their audition. Not wanting to have to return, the band finds the owner Martin Falcon's home address to make him listen to them play. However, when they arrive at his beach house, they let themselves in and find Falcon is not home. They do find Hamlet, Falcon's pet Doberman Pincher dog, who, after Billy sings him a song, becomes fast friends with them. 

Falcon arrives, drunk and assumes they are thieves. Explaining who they are, Jennie pleads that he listen to their music, but Falcon informs them that they are in fact a day early. Having very little money and no place to stay, he offers them the room that the winners are supposed to be staying in for the summer. The "room" is a tool shack with room for 5 beds. The next night, the band auditions and the overwhelming applauding crowd response convinces Falcon to hire them for the summer.

The band members stick out like a sore thumb in the preppy beach side area, especially Mooch, who refuses to take off her black leather jacket, although the weather is hot. Daryle (who has broken up with Frankie) starts dating a local rich boy and gets the band invited to his parties. Billy, uncomfortable, starts taking more pills than usual to cope with her depression. Jennie encourages Mooch to spend time with Nicky, who has a crush on her, and Jennie begins seeing the older Falcon. 

Falcon tells Jennie he has a music agent friend who books bands for European gigs, and is coming to the club to watch the band perform. When Falcon learns that she is considering moving in with him, breaks up with her as he doesn't want her to give up any opportunities because of him. Billy nearly overdoses, and Frankie causes a small riot when he goes to the club and sees Daryle on stage being ogled by the locals.

On the night the agent goes to the club, Jennie runs out just after performing a song written by Falcon especially for the band, and the street gang finally catches up with Mooch for taking their van. The band all helps Mooch fight off the leader and, finally, Hamlet the dog chases them from the club, who are then arrested. When asked what the agent said, Jennie implies that the agent loved their music but she turned down his offer for the band to play in European clubs. 

Upset with Jennie that she would turn down such a huge opportunity, Nicky explains to the rest that the music agent did not want the band, but only Jennie with studio musicians. She decides it wouldn't have been any fun without them. Jennie says goodbye to Falcon, and the band heads home with Hamlet now a part of the band.

Main cast
 Justine Bateman as Jennie Lee
 Liam Neeson as Martin Falcon
 Trini Alvarado as "Mooch"
 Julia Roberts as Daryle
 Scott Coffey as Nickie
 Britta Phillips as Billy
 Debbie Harry as Tina
 Chris Nash as Frankie
 Michael DeLorenzo as "Bunny" Slotz
 Tom O'Brien as "Hubba"
 Steve Cropper as Sal

Production
The film was a theatrical film made by NBC Productions, an offshoot of the NBC network, then under Brandon Tartikoff. It was a vehicle for Justine Bateman who was then on the network's popular sitcom Family Ties.

"I admire her courage to stand up there and sing," said Bateman's brother Jason, who was starring in the sitcom Valerie's Family at the time and had also just made his starring debut in a feature. "You can bet her movie is going to do better than [my feature] Teen Wolf Too."

""The film is about that time in your life when you want to do something with your life within a creative environment in a constructive way," said Bateman.

Bateman took singing and guitar lessons and she and the cast rehearsed for six weeks. Filming took place in South Carolina. Bateman could not sing but said "Luckily, we're just supposed to be a garage band because my voice is very far from Sarah Vaughan's."

Bateman's Family Ties co star Michael J. Fox had recently made a rock movie called Light of Day. "The only similarity between the two movies is that both characters are in a band," said Bateman. "I wouldn't call Satisfaction light comedy, but it's . . . remember the Jodie Foster movie Foxes? It's similar to that feeling."

"I can't worry about 'changing my image' or whether I even have 'an image,'" said Bateman. "It's just me. I've done enough work that illustrates I'm just acting. Mallory [her character in Family Ties] is one character, the character in the film is another. I don't have any great plan, or feel that I need one. I feel I've balanced things pretty well. I try not to take myself too seriously. I'm 21, after all—you can't plan your life out till you're 80."

Soundtrack
A soundtrack for the movie was released in 1988. Billed as being performed by Justine Bateman & The Mystery (as Jennie Lee & the Mystery in film credits), the instruments are actually performed by session players, with Bateman on lead vocals and co-star Britta Phillips on background vocals. The lead vocal on "Mr. Big Stuff" was sung by Phillips. The soundtrack also featured songs by other artists.

Track listing:

 "(I Can't Get No) Satisfaction" – Justine Bateman & the Mystery
 "Knock on Wood" – Justine Bateman & the Mystery
 "Lies" – Justine Bateman & the Mystery
 "Mr. Big Stuff" – Justine Bateman & the Mystery
 "Rock and Roll Rebels" – John Kay & Steppenwolf
 "Iko Iko" – Justine Bateman & the Mystery
 "C'mon Everybody" – Justine Bateman & the Mystery
 "Talk to Me" – Justine Bateman & the Mystery
 "Mystery Dance" – Justine Bateman & the Mystery
 "Maybe" – The Chantels
 "Love Theme from Satisfaction" – Michel Columbier
 "(I Can't Get No) Satisfaction (Version 2)" – Justine Bateman & the Mystery

Reception

The film received poor reviews. The New York Times called it "a typical, low-budget summer movie, where everyone has a hot romance, a good body and an expensive haircut." The Los Angeles Times''' critic Michael Wilmington called it "a movie—supposedly about an '80s rock band—where the songs date from the '60s, the language and sexual attitudes suggest the '70s and the plot is pure '50s." A DVD Talk reviewer said that it was "no wonder these gals can't get any satisfaction; their combined musical "talents" make Brittney Spears [sic] look like Aretha Franklin, their clothes are freaking ridiculous, and they're stuck in a movie that looks precisely like a 'girls on vacation' episode of Beverly Hills 90210, or worse yet, a pre-teen version of Coyote Ugly."

The film opened at eighth place earning $2.3 million.Satisfaction'' holds a 40% rating on Rotten Tomatoes based on five reviews.

References

External links
 
 
 

1988 films
1988 comedy-drama films
1980s musical comedy-drama films
20th Century Fox films
American musical comedy-drama films
American rock music films
1980s English-language films
Films about musical groups
Films directed by Joan Freeman
Films scored by Michel Colombier
Films set in Florida
Films shot in Baltimore
Films shot in South Carolina
NBC Productions films
American drama television films
1980s female buddy films
Films about girl groups
1980s American films